George Albert Gale (1893-1951) was an American artist, shipbuilder, and sailor who painted nautical scenes and created nautical-themed etchings.

References

1893 births
1951 deaths
20th-century American painters
American male painters
20th-century American male artists